La Influencia or La influencia may refer to:

La Influencia (2007 film), 2007 Mexican-Spanish drama film 
The Influence (2019 film), 2019 Spanish horror film also called in Spanish as La influencia